The Jean-Paul II Interdiocesan Major Seminary (French: Grand séminaire interdiocésain Jean-Paul II) is a Roman Catholic Seminary in the Hédjranawoé district of Lomé, the capital of Togo. It was opened in 1988 as a training center for priests. 95 students were enrolled in 1992, 159 in 1999, and 307 in 2008.

Rectors
2003-2008 Jacques Danka Longa

References

External links
Facebook page of the Grand Séminaire Interdiocésain Saint Jean Paul II de Lomé

Catholic seminaries in Africa
History of Togo
Lomé
1988 establishments in Africa
Educational institutions established in 1988